Afonso Celso de Assis Figueiredo, the Viscount of Ouro Preto  (2 February 1836 – 21 February 1912) was a Brazilian politician, and the last Prime Minister of the Empire of Brazil.

Biography

Personal life
Afonso Celso was born in Ouro Preto, then capital of the province of Minas Gerais. He married on 6 January 1859 with Francisca de Paula Martins de Toledo (1839–1916), daughter of the Colonel of the National Guard and counselor Joaquim Floriano de Toledo, and his second wife, Ana Margarida da Graça Martins. From the marriage between the Viscount of Ouro Preto and Francisca de Paula was born the immortal Count Afonso Celso de Assis Figueiredo Júnior, who came to found the Jornal do Brasil (he would not have founded but collaborated for more than 30 years in the newspaper). Francisca de Paula was the sister of Carlota Martins de Toledo, wife of Jorge João Dodsworth, the second Baron of Javari. Dodsworth was the brother-in-law of the baron of Tefe and, therefore, uncle of Nair de Tefé, which was First Lady of Presidente Hermes da Fonseca.

His brother, Carlos Afonso de Assis Figueiredo, was Minister of War and president of the province of Rio de Janeiro. The Viscount of Ouro Preto wrote a work of history about the first ten years of the Republic.

Career

Member of the Liberal Party, Afonso Celso was elected senator by the province of Minas Gerais and took office on 26 April 1879. He also held the positions of Secretary of Police, Inspector of the Provincial Treasury and procurator of the Treasury. Having been provincial deputy in two terms and general deputy for Minas Gerais four times.

Still in the Empire, the viscount of Ouro Preto, convicted monarchist, embraced the abolitionist cause. As senator, he created a tax of 20 réis on the price of tram tickets, a fact that generated great agitation in Rio de Janeiro, known as the "Revolta do Vintém", in January 1880.

He published, among other works, the squadron and the parliamentary opposition and Advent of the military dictatorship. He was awarded the Viscount's nobiliarchic title with greatness on 13 June 1888 by Isabel, Princess Imperial of Brazil, who was acting as regent.

He was Minister of the Navy and of the Treasury and member of the Council of State. It presided over the last Council of Ministers of the Empire. Assis Figueiredo was arrested on 15 November 1889 at Campo de Santana Headquarters, on the day of the proclamation of the republic, with the whole ministry, and then exiled with the Brazilian Imperial Family.

Later life

He lived in exile until 1892, a year after the Emperor's death, when he was allowed to return and decided not to pursue a career in republican politics.

At the beginning of the 20th century, after the proclamation of the republic, he was professor of Civil and Commercial Law at the Free School of Legal and Social Sciences of Rio de Janeiro. He was one of the most important politicians of the Second Reign of the Empire of Brazil and great friend of Emperor Pedro II.

He died in Rio de Janeiro in 1912 at 76 years of age. He was buried in the São João Baptista cemetery.

Imperial cabinet
He was president of the Council of Ministers and simultaneously Minister of Finance

Ministry of the Empire: Franklin Dória
Ministry of Foreign Affairs: José Francisco Diana
Ministry of Justice: Cândido Luís Maria de Oliveira
Ministry of War: Rufino Eneas Gustavo Galvão
Ministry of the Navy: José da Costa Azevedo
Ministry of Transport and Public Works: Lourenço Cavalcanti de Albuquerque

Titles and honors

Titles of nobility
Viscount of Ouro Preto (Grandee) on 13 June 1888.

Honors
 Grand Cross of the Brazilian Order of the Rose.
 Knight of the Brazilian Order of Saint Benedict of Aviz.
 Dignitary of the Brazilian Order of the Southern Cross.
 Dignitary of the Brazilian Order of Christ.

1836 births
1912 deaths
Prime Ministers of Brazil
Finance Ministers of Brazil
People from Ouro Preto
Brazilian monarchists
Brazilian nobility
Liberal Party (Brazil) politicians